Heavy on the Magick is a video game for Amstrad CPC and ZX Spectrum published in 1986 by Gargoyle Games. The game's influences draw heavily from the occult, with the Master Therion in the plot below a reference to Aleister Crowley. To finish the game, the player must invoke numerous demons who are based on their "real" counterparts, e.g. Belezbar is based on Beelzebub.

Plot

Gameplay
The player controls the neophyte wizard Axil the Able and must help him escape from the dungeons below the castle of Colloden's Pile. This a keyboard-only game, and uses a set of commands (called "Merphish" in-game) such as the standard north, south, east and west (N,S,E,W) and some additional unique commands such as invoke (I), freeze (f), and blast (b) which cast spells. Conversations with certain friendly characters such as Apex the Ogre are initiated in the following syntax: "[character],[speech]" e.g. "Apex, thanks".

The dungeons are full of dangerous and hostile creatures such as wyverns, goblins and vampires. Axil can defend himself using magic to stall or kill these creatures. Not everyone in the dungeon is an enemy, some inhabitants (such as Apex the Ogre) are friendly unless provoked and can be conversed with.

The dungeon itself is separated into several distinct levels which Axil can travel to and from at will provided he can find the staircases up or down.

The game could be finished in three different ways, each way being of
varying difficulty. The game was planned to be the first part of a trilogy, but the other games were never created.

Reception
Reviews of the game were highly positive all round, with the only common criticism being the blocky graphics. To reduce the memory impact of the large animated graphics, the programmers blew up single graphic cells to create all the sprites and foreground scenery in the game, effectively reducing the resolution of the graphics but compressing them in memory and so increasing the amount of space available for game content.

The game won the award for best adventure game of the year in CRASH. It was also  runner-up in the Golden Joystick Awards.

References

External links
 
 CRASH review from 1986

1980s interactive fiction
1986 video games
Amstrad CPC games
Europe-exclusive video games
Gargoyle Games games
Single-player video games
Video games developed in the United Kingdom
ZX Spectrum games